Khalid Butti (Arabic:خالد بطي) (born 29 August 1991) is an Emirati footballer. He currently plays as a right back for Al Dhafra.

External links

References

Emirati footballers
1991 births
Living people
Al Jazira Club players
Al Dhafra FC players
UAE Pro League players
Association football fullbacks